Gusht-e Pazan (also Romanized as Gūsht-e Pazān and Gūsht Pazān; also known as Gūsht-e Bozān and Gūsht Parān) is a village in Shabkhus Lat Rural District, Rankuh District, Amlash County, Gilan Province, Iran. At the 2006 census, its population was 483, in 142 families.

References 

Populated places in Amlash County